Joazhiño Walhir Arroe Salcedo (born 5 June 1992) is a Peruvian footballer who plays as a winger or striker for Alianza Lima.
Arroe made his professional debut in 2009–10 Coppa Italia.

Club career
Arroe made his first team debut in November 2009, against Grosseto as a last minute substitute. The Cup match ended with Siena defeating Grosseto 2–0. He arrived in Italy in June 2007, at the age of 15. Although below the minimum age of international transfer, which required the player to be aged 18 or above (except within EEA, which is 16 with additional requirements), his agent Fabián Soldini let him travel with his family for reasons other than football to fulfil the FIFA regulations, like Soldini brought Lionel Messi to Spain for medical treatment and education.

Despite Siena getting relegated to Serie B for the 2010–11 season, he remained with the club's Primavera team, which was eliminated in the quarter-final stage of the 2011 Torneo di Viareggio. and the first round (round of 32) of 2010–11 Coppa Italia Primavera.

Since Siena achieved promotion back to Serie A, it was announced on 29 August 2011 that Arroe would join Peruvian club Alianza Lima on loan for the 2011–12 season so that he could gain first team experience. He joined Alianza Lima during the final part of the 2011 Descentralizado season. Arroe made his Peruvian First Division debut on 22 October 2011 in round 25 away to Colegio Nacional Iquitos.
He entered the match in 85th minute, and the match finished in a 1–0 win for Alianza Lima.
On 31 August, he signed for SC Braga to play in the second team.

International career
Arroe was a regular in youth international football tournaments. He received a call-up to 2007 South American Under-15 Football Championship (played all 4 matches), 2009 South American Under-17 Football Championship (played all 4 matches) and 2011 South American Youth Championship. He also received several call-up for friendlies and training sessions for the South American Youth Cup.

At the South American Youth Cup, he wore the number 9 shirt but only made 2 substitute appearances and started the last match of the group stage. Peru failed to advance to the next stage.

References

External links

Siena Profile  
 

1992 births
Living people
Sportspeople from Callao
Peruvian footballers
A.C.N. Siena 1904 players
Club Alianza Lima footballers
Serie B players
Peruvian Primera División players
Sporting Cristal footballers
S.C. Braga B players
Peru under-20 international footballers
Peruvian expatriate footballers
Expatriate footballers in Italy
Expatriate footballers in Portugal
Peruvian expatriate sportspeople in Italy
Peruvian expatriate sportspeople in Portugal
Association football wingers